The 10th General Assembly of Prince Edward Island represented the colony of Prince Edward Island between November 3, 1818, and 1820.

The Assembly sat at the pleasure of the Governor of Prince Edward Island, Charles Douglass Smith.  Angus McAulay was elected speaker.

Members

The members of the Prince Edward Island Legislature after the general election of 1818 were:

External links 
 Journal of the House of Assembly of Prince Edward Island (1819)

Terms of the General Assembly of Prince Edward Island
1818 establishments in Prince Edward Island
1820 disestablishments in Prince Edward Island